Holey Plains State Park is a  state park in East Gippsland, Victoria in south-eastern Australia. It is known for its exceptionally diverse flora, with about one in five plant species known in Victoria present in the park. The park is situated between Rosedale and Sale. It was opened in 1977.

The terrain is mostly Banksia and Eucalyptus with open forest and woodlands growing on sandy ridges.

References

State parks of Victoria (Australia)
Protected areas established in 1977
1977 establishments in Australia